Viviane Victorette (born December 15, 1978, in Fortaleza) is a Brazilian actress.

Career 
Viviane began her career at her hometown. As a teenager, she made some plays and advertising campaigns. In 1999, she moved to Rio de Janeiro, to enlarge the possibilities of success. She studied at the Art House of Orange, in the south of Rio, and got to know the director Marcelo Andrade, who invited her to several children's plays, like Snow White.

She auditioned for TV Globo, in 2001, prime time, the role of "Regininha", which led to the award of revelation in the "Festival of Film and Television Natal". She returned to television on the invitation of Aguinaldo Silva, to act on Duas Caras.

In September 2005, made the cover of Playboy magazine. She was invited to be the queen of the samba school drum Reborn Jacarepaguá, but withdrew and was replaced by actress Rita Guedes. In the same year she traveled to rest and stayed away from the revelry.

She returned in 2011 for a part as a girl from the Jana program, in Insensato Coração. After two years of preparation, she returned to TV Series in Flor do Caribe, interpreting Marinalva, a dancer. In 2015 she returned to a quick participation in Malhação, as one of Uodson's sweethearts (Lucas Lucco).

Personal life 
The actress was married to photographer Diego Suassuna, who has a daughter named Júlia.

The actress is a vegetarian, yoga devotee and healthy lifestyle.

Filmography

References

External links 

1978 births
Living people
People from Fortaleza
Brazilian television actresses
Brazilian telenovela actresses
Brazilian film actresses
Brazilian stage actresses